Cerace charidotis is a species of moth of the family Tortricidae. It is found in Vietnam.

References

Moths described in 1992
Ceracini
Moths of Asia
Taxa named by Józef Razowski